George Lynn Paige (May 5, 1882 in Paw Paw, Michigan – June 8, 1939 in Berlin, Wisconsin), nicknamed "Piggy", was a Major League Baseball pitcher who played for one season. He pitched in two games for the Cleveland Naps during the 1911 Cleveland Naps season.

External links

1882 births
1939 deaths
Major League Baseball pitchers
Cleveland Naps players
Baseball players from Minnesota
Calumet Aristocrats players
Denver Grizzlies (baseball) players
Norfolk Tars players
Charleston Sea Gulls players
New Haven Blues players
Knoxville Appalachians players
New Orleans Pelicans (baseball) players
Toledo Mud Hens players
Atlanta Crackers players
Montgomery Rebels players
Nashville Vols players
Austin Senators players
Chattanooga Lookouts players
People from Paw Paw, Michigan